This article describes the party affiliations of the leaders of each member-state represented in the European Council during the year 2003. The list below gives the political party that each head of government, or head of state, belonged to at the national level, as well as the European political alliance to which that national party belonged. The states are listed from most to least populous. More populous states have greater influence in the council, in accordance with the system of Qualified Majority Voting.

During the period in question there was a change of the governing party only in Finland. In April Anneli Jäätteenmäki of the  Centre Party succeeded Paavo Lipponen of the Social Democrats as State Minister (prime minister of Finland). She remained in office only until June when she resigned in a corruption scandal. She was succeeded by Matti Vanhanen from her own party.

Summary

List of leaders (1 January 2003)

Changes

Affiliation

Office-holder only

See also
Presidency of the Council of the European Union

External links
Council of the European Union (official website)

Lists of parties in the European Council